The St George's Church attack, also known as the massacre of the Saint George Church, was a massacre of Maronite Christian worshipers in the Lebanese village of Brih in the Chouf mountains which took place on August 21, 1977, during the Lebanese Civil War.

Druze leftist gunmen attacked St George's Church during prayers on Sunday with automatic gunfire inside and around the church killing 13 people.

Motives 
The attack was part of a series of massacres of Christians in the Chouf region which was in response following the March 16 assassination of Kamal Jumblatt, founder of the Progressive Socialist Party by the Syrian army and traditional leader of the Druze community.

Aftermath 
Brih's Christian population fled the village. However, current construction projects have taken place to repair abandoned Christian houses with the aim of repopulating the Christian households of Brih.

See also
Lebanese Civil War
People's Liberation Army (Lebanon)
Progressive Socialist Party
Mountain War (Lebanon)

References 

1977 in Lebanon
Massacres of the Lebanese Civil War
1977 murders in Lebanon
August 1977 crimes
August 1977 events in Asia
Attacks on churches in Asia
Chouf District
Massacres of Christians in Lebanon
Massacres in religious buildings and structures